Greenhorn is a non-populated city in Baker and Grant counties in the U.S. state of Oregon. It straddles the Blue Mountain ridge, so that it is located in both Grant County and Baker County. As most of the city is situated in Baker County, and the early residents considered Baker City to be more convenient, for administrative purposes it is considered to be in Baker County.

As of the 2000 census, the city had a total population of 0, with 7 housing units. As of the 2010 census, the population was 0, with 10 housing units.

History 

Greenhorn was first populated in the 1860s as miners prospected for gold in the area. It was platted in 1904, though it lost two-thirds of its population between 1900 and 1910.  The mining district was composed first of placer mines, but soon many lode gold mines developed.  The city was incorporated in 1903 and had a population of 28 in 1910.  It continued as a viable community until 1942 when gold mining was made illegal by Federal Public Law 208 during World War II.

In later years, the old Greenhorn Jail (dating to around 1910) was removed to Canyon City under suspicious circumstances.  A court case ensued for its return, but because the city straddles the Blue Mountain ridge, the district attorneys of Baker County and Grant County could not even agree in which court house it should be held.  The case was eventually heard by the Circuit Court for Grant County in Canyon City, Oregon.  The jail remains in Canyon City, Oregon.

Geography 

The city is in the Greenhorn Mountains, a small range within the broader Blue Mountains, and is surrounded by the Malheur National Forest and Wallowa–Whitman National Forest.

It is also unique in that the city was established on land that was originally patented from the United States for the purpose of platting the city (rather than being homesteaded by individuals). (See Town of Greenhorn v. Baker County, 596 F2D 349.)

Demographics 

As of the census of 2000, there were no people living in the city. The same was true in 2010. As of 2013, the Baker City Herald reported that Greenhorn had two "year-round" residents. The Herald reported at that time that the community had about 13 cabins and 20 part-time residents.

Government
As of 2015, Zack Koellermeier and Brad Poyser of Oregon City, Nathan Wright of La Grande, and Keith Rofinot of Tigard serve on the city council. Mayor Dale McLouth lives in Molalla.

See also
List of ghost towns in Oregon

References

External links 

 Entry for Greenhorn in the Oregon Blue Book

Ghost town of Greenhorn Oregon from PNWPhotoblog.com

1903 establishments in Oregon
Cities in Oregon
Ghost towns in Oregon
Populated places established in 1903
Cities in Baker County, Oregon
Cities in Grant County, Oregon